Connecticut's 55th House of Representatives district elects one member of the Connecticut House of Representatives. It consists of the towns of Andover, Bolton, Hebron, and Marlborough. It has been represented by Republican Robin Green since 2017.

Recent elections

2020

2018

2016

2014

2012

References

55